Strike Force is a 1975 television film directed by Barry Shear and starring Richard Gere.

Premise
A federal agent and a New York City detective join forces with state trooper to break up a drug ring. Inspired by the real-life theft of the narcotics held in evidence of the French Connection case, discovered missing from the NYPD Property clerk's office in 1972.

References

External links

1975 television films
1975 films
Films about drugs
American television films
American crime films
Films directed by Barry Shear
1970s English-language films
1970s American films